Sheikh Kamal Textile Engineering College is an undergraduate government engineering college located in the Jhenaidah district of the Khulna division of Bangladesh. The college offers four year BSc Engineering degree under Bangladesh Textile University. In the 2017–18 academic year, the college started its academic activities in BSc Engineering in Textile Engineering.

History 
Sheikh Kamal Textile Engineering College was named after Sheikh Kamal (5 August 1949 – 15 August 1975) was the eldest son of Sheikh Mujibur Rahman, former President of Bangladesh. Kamal was an organizer of the Mukti Bahini guerrilla struggle in 1971. Kamal was received a wartime commission in Bangladesh Army during the Liberation War of Bangladesh.

Laboratory 
 Physics Lab
 Chemistry lab
 Computer lab
 Yarn Manufacturing Lab
 Fabric Manufacturing Lab
 Weight Processing Lab
 Fashion Design Lab

References

Educational institutions of Khulna Division
Textile schools in Bangladesh
Technological institutes of Bangladesh
Colleges affiliated to Bangladesh University of Textiles